Jean-Pierre Bernard (22 January 1933 – 7 July 2017) was a French film, television and stage actor. He appeared in many French films over a 50-year period and became known internationally for his portrayal of a French climber named Jean-Paul Montaigne in the 1975 film The Eiger Sanction that was directed by and starred Clint Eastwood.

Bernard studied at the French National Academy of Dramatic Arts. His French language film appearances include: Adelaide (1968) directed by Jean-Daniel Simon, Le Soulier de satin (1985) directed by Manoel de Oliveira and Mon ami le traître (1988) directed by José Giovanni .

Filmography

References

External links

 

1933 births
2017 deaths
French male film actors
Male actors from Paris
French National Academy of Dramatic Arts alumni
20th-century French male actors